The Judge P. W. White House (also known as the Methodist Parsonage) is a historic home in Quincy, Florida, United States. It is located at 212 North Madison Street. On December 5, 1972, it was added to the U.S. National Register of Historic Places.

References

External links
Florida's Office of Cultural and Historical Programs
Gadsden County listings
Gadsden County markers

Houses in Gadsden County, Florida
Houses on the National Register of Historic Places in Florida
Historic American Buildings Survey in Florida
National Register of Historic Places in Gadsden County, Florida
Houses completed in 1843
1843 establishments in Florida Territory